Jean-Julien Rojer and Horia Tecău were the two-time defending champions, and chose not to participate this year.

Łukasz Kubot and Marcelo Melo won the title, defeating Nicholas Monroe and Tennys Sandgren, 6–7(6–8), 6–1, [10–3].

Seeds

Draw

Draw

References

External links
 Main Draw

Winston-Salem Open - Doubles
2019 Doubles